Saint Catherine West Central is a parliamentary constituency represented in the House of Representatives of the Jamaican Parliament. It elects one Member of Parliament MP by the first past the post system of election.

Members of Parliament 

 Enid Bennett (1976 to 1997)

Boundaries 

Constituency covers Red Hills, Bellvue and Point Hill.

References

Parliamentary constituencies of Jamaica